The Riverine Flotilla of the Polish Navy, better known as the Pinsk Flotilla, was the inland branch of the Polish Navy operating on the Vistula river and in the area of the Pinsk Marshes (Dnieper–Bug Canal) between the Polish–Bolshevik War and World War II. Under Commodore Witold Zajączkowski, it was active in the invasion of Poland and fought against both German and Soviet forces.

History 

During the Polish-Bolshevik War the Pinsk Marshes  proved to be almost impassable to troops of both sides. Lack of roads and railways posed a serious danger to infantry and cavalry that could easily be cut off both by the enemy and the weather. Because of that, a number of river monitors were either constructed or acquired from private owners and armed. They were used on the Pripyat River, as well as its extensive river basin. After the war, some of the ships were returned to their owners, the rest remained on active service and were pressed into the so-called Pinsk Flotilla.

In  peace-time the Riverine Flotilla of the Polish Navy, as it was officially called, operated on the Pina River (Dnieper–Bug Canal), as well as on the Pripyat and the Strumień rivers. It served as a mobile reserve of the Border Defense Corps and was to support the front in case of a war with the Soviet Union. Prior to the invasion of Poland, a number of ships of the Riverine Flotilla were moved to the Vistula as a detachment and became Oddział Wydzielony Rzeki Wisły, better known as the Vistula Flotilla.

In the Polish operational plans, the Pinsk flotilla was to form a mobile strategic reserve of the Polish Army in the area and was to constitute the core of the forces defending the area of the Pinsk Marshes. The Polish commander-in-chief and Marshal of Poland, Edward Rydz-Śmigły, forecast that the area would be used for a last stand by the Polish Army, where it would await the relief on the western front from Poland's allies. However the Invasion of Poland on  September 1, 1939 made the plans obsolete.

During actions against the Soviets and the Germans, most of the ships were scuttled by their crews to avoid capture. In 1939-40 most of them were refloated, repaired, rearmed and included in the Soviet Pinsk Naval Flotilla (1940). They took an active part in battles of World War II but were mostly destroyed in 1941.

See also

 Polish Navy
 Order of Battle of the Riverine Flotilla of the Polish Navy
 Vessels of Polish Riverine Flotilla

References

External links
Interesting and detailed polish page about the Pinsk River Fleet
Map of the Pinsk River Fleet area during the 1920s

Invasion of Poland
Polish Navy
Riverine warfare
Western Belorussia (1918–1939)